Siegmund Hegeholz is a Paralympic athlete from Germany competing mainly in category F11 javelin events.

Biography
Siegmund has competed at six Paralympic Games. His first was in 1984  where he represented East Germany. He competed in triple jump and won silver medals in both the long jump and pentathlon.  He then missed 1988 (East Germany did not participate) before returning for the 1992 Summer Paralympics where -now representing a reunified Germany- he won the B2 javelin as well as competing in various other events.  1996 saw Siegmund finish second in the javelin but miss out on the discus and shot put.  In 2000 he won his second gold medal at javelin while 2004 saw him end up second.  His sixth Paralympics saw him finish seventh in the javelin.

References

Paralympic athletes of East Germany
Paralympic athletes of Germany
Athletes (track and field) at the 1984 Summer Paralympics
Athletes (track and field) at the 1992 Summer Paralympics
Athletes (track and field) at the 1996 Summer Paralympics
Athletes (track and field) at the 2000 Summer Paralympics
Athletes (track and field) at the 2004 Summer Paralympics
Athletes (track and field) at the 2008 Summer Paralympics
Paralympic gold medalists for Germany
Paralympic silver medalists for Germany
Living people
Medalists at the 1992 Summer Paralympics
Medalists at the 1996 Summer Paralympics
Medalists at the 2000 Summer Paralympics
Medalists at the 2004 Summer Paralympics
Year of birth missing (living people)
Medalists at the 1984 Summer Paralympics
Paralympic medalists in athletics (track and field)
German male javelin throwers
Visually impaired javelin throwers
Paralympic javelin throwers